The Journal of Electroanalytical Chemistry is a peer-reviewed scientific journal on electroanalytical chemistry, published by Elsevier twice per month. It was originally established in 1959 under the current name, but was known as the Journal of Electroanalytical Chemistry and Interfacial Electrochemistry  from 1967 to 1991. It is currently edited by X.-H. Xia (Nanjing University). The journal is associated with the International Society of Electrochemistry. While the journal is now published exclusively in English, earlier volumes sometimes published articles in French and German.

The journal, which The New York Times described as "a specialty publication not widely circulated" in 1990, became more broadly known in 1989 when Martin Fleischmann and Stanley Pons published a description of their controversial cold fusion research in it, withdrawing their work from publication in Nature after questions were raised during peer review there.

Abstracting and indexing
According to the Journal Citation Reports, Journal of Electroanalytical Chemistry has a 2021 impact factor of 4.598. It is abstracted and indexed in the following bibliographic databases
Chemical Abstracts
Current Contents
Metals Abstracts
Engineering Index
INSPEC
World Aluminum Abstracts
Scopus

References

External links
 

Electroanalytical chemistry
Elsevier academic journals
Electrochemistry journals
Cold fusion
Publications established in 1959